Jake Yuzna is an American film director, screenwriter, and curator. His debut feature Open was the first American film to win the Teddy Jury Prize at the Berlin Film Festival and in 2005 Yuzna become the youngest recipient of funding from the National Endowment for the Arts.

Although known mainly for his work in film, Yuzna has curated several retrospectives, exhibitions and special projects.  In 2010, he founded the first cinema program at the Museum of Arts and Design in New York City. Between 2011 - 2013 he organized the first fellowship, publication and conference to argue nightlife as a form of contemporary art. In addition, Yuzna has authored books on contemporary art, design, and culture as well as contributed to Artforum.

He has also curated the first American retrospectives of artists and filmmakers including Alejandro Jodorowsky, Sion Sono, Gregg Araki, Francois Sagat, and Quentin Crisp. In addition, Yuzna curated the first museum surveys of Metamodernsim, the New French Extremity, and the medium of VHS.

Yuzna is the son of poet Susan Yuzna and nephew to horror film director and producer Brian Yuzna.

Filmography

Awards and honors
2005: "Special Jury Award for Artistic Risktaking" from IFP
2010: "Teddy Jury Prize" for Open (60th Berlin Film Festival)
2010: "Best Narrative Feature" for Open (TLV Festival)
2010: "Best Performance" for Morty Diamond in Open (New Fest)
2012: Creative Capital Award in Filmmaking
2018: "Richard P. Rogers Spirit of Excellence Award" from the America Film Institute
2019: "McKnight Fellowship in Media Artists" from McKnight Foundation and FilmNorth
2020: "The Blood List" from British Horror Film Festival
2021: "Guggenheim Fellowship" from John Simon Guggenheim Foundation

Publications

Curation

References

External links 
 

1982 births
American people of German descent
Male screenwriters
American male writers
American experimental filmmakers
American documentary film directors
English-language film directors
Living people
Film directors from Minnesota
Writers from Minneapolis
LGBT film directors
American LGBT screenwriters
Screenwriters from Minnesota
Queer men